The Samuel Baker House, at 150 W. 200 North in Mendon, Utah, was built in the 1870s. It was listed on the National Register of Historic Places in 1983.

It is a one-and-a-half-story hall and parlor plan stone house, built with mild suggestion of Greek Revival style in the form of a plain cornice and frieze.

References

National Register of Historic Places in Cache County, Utah
Greek Revival architecture in Utah
Houses completed in 1875